Maksim Lepskiy may refer to:

 Maksim Nikolayevich Lepskiy (born 1992), Russian footballer
 Maksim Stanislavovich Lepskiy (born 1985), Russian footballer